Pamela Jane Barry (born July 10, 1944) is a chemist and former politician in New Brunswick. She represented Saint John West and then Saint John Lancaster in the Legislative Assembly of New Brunswick from 1987 to 1999 as a Liberal member.

Biography

Early years
She was born in Halifax, Nova Scotia and was educated at Mount St. Vincent University and Saint Francis Xavier University, receiving a B.Sc.

Career
Barry worked as a chemist for Lantic Sugar Limited and as a research assistant at the University of Alberta Faculty of Pharmacy. She served in the province's Executive Council as Minister of State for Childhood Services, Minister of the Environment and Solicitor General. Barry was defeated in the 1999 general election.

From 2000 to 2011, Barry was the executive director of The Greater Saint John Community Foundation.

References 
 List of Women MLAs, New Brunswick Legislative Library

1944 births
Living people
New Brunswick Liberal Association MLAs
Members of the Executive Council of New Brunswick
Women MLAs in New Brunswick
Women government ministers of Canada
20th-century Canadian chemists
Mount Saint Vincent University alumni
St. Francis Xavier University alumni
People from Halifax, Nova Scotia
20th-century Canadian women scientists
Canadian women chemists